Fasano is a town and comune in the Province of Brindisi, Apulia, southern Italy. It is the second most populated town in the province after Brindisi, with a population in 2021 of 39,026.

History

According to a folk etymology, the name Fasano derives from the "Faso", a large wild columbus dove (also represented on the civic coat of arms) which drank from the fogge, which was a type of swamp or pool in the open air formed from the water that flowed down from the surrounding hills. This area where the pool once was is now a communal garden.

Via Appia, the road from Brindisi to Rome during ancient times, runs along Fasano's costal frazioni, including Savelletri and is visible today.

Geography

Location
It marks the border between the Salento and the Metropolitan City of Bari.

The municipality borders Alberobello (BA), Cisternino, Locorotondo (BA), Monopoli (BA) and Ostuni. It counts the hamlets (frazioni) of Canale di Pirro, Laureto, Montalbano, Pezze di Greco, Pozzo Faceto, Savelletri, Selva di Fasano, Speziale, Torre Canne and Torre Spaccata.

Environment
Fasano is situated in an area with olive trees and its territory extends from hills to the sea with rich Mediterranean vegetation.

Coming down from hills the town of Fasano occupies a dominant position in the valley which then leads down to the sea:  coastal resorts include Savelletri with its beaches, the archaeological digs at Gnatia and a golf course and the quaint fishing town of Torre Canne. The coast is characterized by a peaceful atmosphere that prevails despite growing tourism.

Around Fasano are Pezze di Greco, Montalbano, Speziale and Pozzo Faceto, centres of secular olive cultivation; and a range of medieval fortified masserie, or farmhouses, aimed at agricultural tourism.

Population

Main sights

Religious
 Archaeological Park of Egnatia, an Ancient Italic city and former bishopric Egnazia Appula
 Church of San Giovanni Battista (Chiesa Matrice), built in the 17th century.
 Tempietto di Seppannibale, an early Christian church
 The minaret of Fasano, an Islamic-style construction from 1918.

Other
 Dolmen of Montalbano
 Torrione delle Fogge, the last remaining tower of the original eleven ones.
 The Selva di Fasano, today a garden with villas
 Original trulli houses
 Fasanolandia, the first zoo safari of its kind in Europe

Transport
Fasano station is an important stop, both for regional and long-distance trains, on the Adriatic railway. The SS 16 highway "Adriatica" Padova-Otranto serves the town with two exits, "Fasano" and "Savelletri".

Sport
The A.S. Fasano is the town's football club, and its home ground is the Vito Curlo Stadium. The local handball clubs are the Junior Fasano and Roberto Serra Fasano.

Personalities
Vittorio Ghirelli (b. 1994), racing driver
Renato Olive (b. 1971), former footballer
Said Ahmed (b. 1972), kickboxer three times world champion

See also
Eurofighter
Punta Torre Canne Lighthouse

References

External links

 Local foods from Fasano
 Fasano hotels
 Maps of Fasano at Maplandia
 Cultural events in Fasano

 
Cities and towns in Apulia